Factory Point is a land peninsula separating the Back River and the Chesapeake Bay in the Commonwealth of Virginia.

Factory Point has received much local attention due to erosion by a nor'easter.  The peninsula is the buffer from wave action coming from the Chesapeake Bay into Back River.  Consequently, it has protective value for thousands of homes that adjoin the river. In 1998, a spit of sand connecting Factory Point to Grand View Nature Preserve was washed away in a storm, reducing Factory Point to an island. However, the peninsular was rebuilt and reconnected in the spring of 2010.

External links
 City of Hampton, Parks and Rec

Peninsulas of Virginia
Landforms of Hampton, Virginia